Ronja Jenike (born December 28, 1989) is a German ice hockey player for ESC Planegg and the German national team.

She participated at the 2017 IIHF Women's World Championship.

References

External links

1989 births
Living people
German women's ice hockey defencemen
Sportspeople from Hamburg